Skate or Die is a French action film directed by Miguel Courtois released in 2008.

Plot summary
Mickey and Idriss are two skaters who witness, and film on their cell phone, the killing of three people in a parking lot. Unfortunately for them, the killers notice them and pursue them through the streets of Paris. By taking refuge in a police station, the two young men understand that their pursuers are actually corrupt inspectors.

Cast 
 Mickey Mahut - Mickey
 Idriss Diop - Idriss
 Elsa Pataky - Dany
 Philippe Bas - Lucas
 Passi - Sylla
 Rachida Brakni - Sylvie
 Bernard Le Coq - Carpentier
 Vincent Desagnat - Police officer

References

External links 

 

French action films
2008 films
2008 action films
Films directed by Miguel Courtois
2000s French films
2000s French-language films